Matthew Joseph Galante (born March 22, 1944) is a former minor League baseball infielder and Major League coach and acting manager.

Playing career
The ,  Galante attended St. John's University. While at St. John's in 1964, he played collegiate summer baseball for the Cotuit Kettleers of the Cape Cod Baseball League and was named a league all-star. Galante was selected as the 833rd and final pick of the 1966 Major League Baseball draft by the New York Yankees. He played in the Yankees system from 1966 to 1971, and spent the 1972 and 1973 seasons with the Evansville Triplets, the AAA affiliate of the Milwaukee Brewers.

Coaching career
After his playing career ended, he spent several years as a minor league manager and scout. He was a Houston Astros coach from 1985 to 2001 with the exception of 1997, when he worked in the club's front office and then stepped in as manager of the AAA New Orleans Zephyrs when Steve Swisher resigned a few days into the season.

Matt Galante was acting manager of the Houston Astros for 27 games in 1999, when the manager Larry Dierker was sidelined for health reasons. He compiled a record of 13–14. He was a member of the New York Mets coaching staff from 2002 to 2004. He rejoined the Astros front office in 2005.

Craig Biggio credited Galante with assisting him in transitioning from a Catcher to a Second Baseman, a move that extended his career to 20 years in the Majors. In his Hall of Fame address, he asked Galante to stand up for special recognition, saying, "I wouldn't be here without him."

Galante also managed the Italian baseball team as a part of the 2006 World Baseball Classic.  He is currently an Astros' scout.

References

1944 births
Living people
All-American college baseball players
American people of Italian descent
Sportspeople from Brooklyn
St. John's Red Storm baseball players
Cotuit Kettleers players
Houston Astros managers
Houston Astros coaches
Houston Astros scouts
New York Mets coaches
Syracuse Chiefs players
Sportspeople from Staten Island
Baseball players from New York City
Binghamton Triplets players
Evansville Triplets players
Greensboro Yankees players
Manchester Yankees players